Mauzens-Miremont is a former railway station in Mauzens-et-Miremont, Nouvelle-Aquitaine, France. The station is located on the Niversac - Agen railway line. The station is served by TER Nouvelle-Aquitaine bus services on demand to Les Versannes. Train services were suspended in 2020.

References

Defunct railway stations in Dordogne